= Kremlhoftheater Villach =

Coordinates: 46.607896°N 13.853067°E

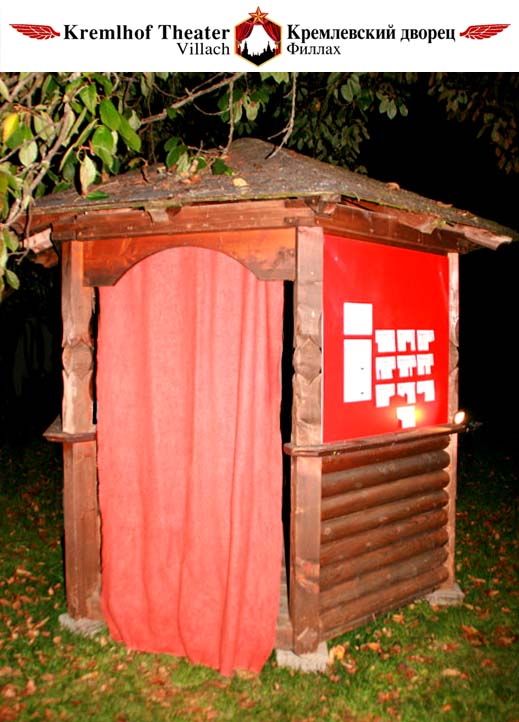
Kremlhoftheater Villach

Kremlhoftheater Villach is a theatre in Austria. It seats only eight people, making it the smallest professional theater by seat capacity, according to Guinness World Records. It opened in 2009 and has been staging regular shows since January 2010. The stage measures 1.30 by 1.30 meters. The theater does not sell any tickets, accepting donations from the audience.
